John McCormick (born November 30, 1954) is Jean Monnet Chair of European Union Politics at Indiana University – Purdue University Indianapolis (IUPUI), and was department chair from 2001 until 2008. He spent eight years working in the environmental movement (working for the World Wide Fund for Nature and the International Institute for Environment and Development) before becoming an academic. His research and teaching interests have moved from environmental policy to comparative politics and the politics and policies of the European Union.

His 2010 book Europeanism is an attempt to pin down the political, economic and social features of Europe and Europeans. It argues that those who focus on the failures of European integration, the mixed record in the achievement of common European policies, and disagreements among European leaders, are missing the bigger picture: that a combination of history and the rise of the European Union have helped encourage Europeans to develop common positions on a wide range of issues. Europeanism today can be equated with reduced identification with the state, secularism, welfarism, cosmopolitanism, communitarianism, multiculturalism, civilian power, and multilateralism. His 2013 book Why Europe Matters makes the case for the European Union, and attempts to address the rising tide of euroscepticism by outlining the achievements of the European Union in promoting peace, democracy, open markets, and a new approach to international relations.

Selected bibliography
Contemporary Britain (Palgrave Macmillan, 4th edition, 2018).
Environmental Politics and Policy (Palgrave Macmillan, 2017).
Understanding the European Union (Palgrave Macmillan, 7th edition, 2017).
Comparative Government and Politics (with Rod Hague and Martin Harrop) (Palgrave Macmillan, 10th edition, 2016).
European Union Politics (Palgrave Macmillan, 2nd edition, 2015).
The European Union: Politics and Policies (Westview Press, 5th edition, 2013).
Why Europe Matters: The Case for the European Union (Palgrave Macmillan, 2013).
Comparative Politics in Transition (Wadsworth/Cengage, 7th edition, 2012).
Europeanism (Oxford University Press, 2010).
The European Superpower (Palgrave Macmillan, 2007).
Environmental Policy in the European Union (Palgrave Macmillan, 2001).
Acid Earth: The Global Threat of Acid Pollution (Earthscan, 3rd edition, 1997).
The Global Environmental Movement (John Wiley & Sons, 1995).
British Politics and the Environment (Earthscan, 1991).

External links
 Faculty web page at IUPUI.
 Review essay "Europe, Europeanism, and European Nationalism" in European Political Science.
 Review essay: "The New European Imaginary" in European Journal of Social Theory.
 Review of "The European Superpower" in Journal of Common Market Studies.
 Review of "The European Superpower" in Foreign Affairs.
 Review of "The European Superpower" in EU Studies Association Review.

Living people
American political scientists
1954 births
Indiana University–Purdue University Indianapolis faculty
Historians of European integration